A Persian name or Iranian name consists of a given name (Persian: نام Nâm), sometimes more than one, and a surname (نام‌ خانوادگی).

Given names

Since the Muslim conquest of Persia, some names in Iran have been derived from Arabic, although the majority are Persian in origin. Persian Christians have Arabic names indistinguishable from their Muslim neighbors. They can also use Arabic derivations of Christian names (such as saints' names), or Greek, Neo-Aramaic, or Armenian names, as most Christian Iranians are Iranian Armenians, although there are also Iranian Assyrians and Iranian Georgians.

Many Persian names come from the Persian literature book, the Shahnameh or "Epic of Kings".  It was composed in the 10th century by Ferdowsi and is considered by many the masterpiece of Persian literature. Approximately 10%-15% of all Persian names are from Shahnameh. A few examples are Abtin, Ardeshir, Armeen, Arzhang, Babak (Papak), Bijan, Bizhan, Bozorgmehr, Darab, Dariush (Darius), Esfandiar/Esfandyar, Javid, Faramarz, Farhad, Fariborz, Farshid, Farzad, Sam and Yazdan.

Last names

Prior to 1919, the Iranian people did not use surnames. An act of the Vossug ed Dowleh government in 1919 introduced the use of surnames, and the practice expanded during the reign of Reza Shah (r. 1925–1941). Reza Shah passed a law making it mandatory to have surnames. He himself chose Pahlavi as of his surname, which has its roots in the Sassanid era. Prior to that, a person was often distinguished from others by a combination of prefixes and suffixes attached to his or her name. If it was omitted, that person might be taken for someone else. Since the adoption of surnames, Ahmadi has become the most popular surname in Iran.

In many cases individuals were known by the name of the district, city, town, or even the village from which they came by using the locality's name as a suffix, for example: Nuri, Khorasani, Mazandarani, Kordestani, Tehrani, Esfahani, Gilani, Hamedani, and Shirazi. The same rule is followed for the many millions of Iranians who have surnames of regions or cities of the Caucasus region. The latter was forcefully ceded in the course of the 19th century to Imperial Russia through the Treaty of Gulistan (1813) and Treaty of Turkmenchay (1828). Examples of common Iranian surnames in this regard are Daghestani, Qarabaghi, Darbandi, Shirvani, Iravani, Nakhjevani, Lankarani. 

Among many other secularization and modernization reforms, surnames were required by Reza Shah, following similar contemporary patterns in Turkey under Mustafa Kemal Atatürk, and later in Egypt under Gamal Abdel Nasser.

Most common names

Note: Some of the names below are of Middle Persian origin

Common male given names

Common female given names
 
 
 
 
 
 
 
 
 
 
 
  Parastu (Parastoo) || Parisa | Parmida | Parvin | | Pegah | Peymaneh | | Pooneh | Poopak

Common surnames

Name terminology

Honorifics
Most of these refer to Muslim titles or roles in branches of Shia Islam
 Aga Khan, hereditary title of the Imam of the Nizari branch of Isma'ilism. As a suffix, it indicates his children, grandchildren, or great-grandchildren.
 Mullah, Muslim cleric. The title has also been used in some Jewish communities to refer to the community's leadership, especially religious leadership.
 Agha (title), Sir, mister. It is a general term of respect.
 Ayatollah, high-ranking title given to Twelver Shiʻi clerics.
 Dervish, a mystic or a spiritual guru in Sufism.
 Khan (title), served at one time as a title for an honored person.
 Ustad, a master craftsperson, lecturer or a person who is the master of a profession.
 Sayyid and sharif, honorific titles that given to men accepted as descendants of Muhammad.
 Shah, "king".

Prefixes
 Hajji, one who had made the Hajj to Mecca.
 Jenaab, sir, excellency.
 Karbala'i, one who has made the pilgrimage to Karbala
 Mashhadi, one who has made the pilgrimage to Mashhad, often shortened to Mashti, or Mash.
 Mir, generally indicates the person is a sayyid(a) or is of royal descent.

Suffixes
-i, the most common suffix used for Persian surnames. They are, in fact, adjectives created by the adding suffix "-i" to person names, location names or other names. Surnames with "-i" are also popular in other countries of historic Greater Persia and neighboring countries like in the Caucasus, Pakistan, Turkey, Iraq, and Central Asia.
-ian, like the above case, but with the addition of the plural suffix "-an", common among Iranians and Armenians. Examples are Shaheenian (Persian) and Sargsyan (Armenian).
-an, similar to English "-s" in "Roberts".
-pour, "descendant of an Army official (Title)".
-zadeh, "descendant of".
-nezhad, -nejad, " of race/clan (Title)".
-nia, "His/Her highness (Title)".
-far, "the light of", see Farr-e Kiyani (Faravahar)
-bakhsh, "granted by".
-dad (Old Persian dāta), "given by".

References

External links
 Persian/Iranian Names
 Persian boy names
 Persian girl names
 1084 Persian baby names for boys
 748 Persian given names for girls
 300 Persian names for twin babies

Names by culture
Persian language